Lamar A. Chapman (born November 6, 1976) is a former American football cornerback who played two seasons with the Cleveland Browns of the National Football League (NFL). He was drafted by the Cleveland Browns in the fifth round of the 2000 NFL Draft. He played college football at Kansas State University and attended Liberal High School in Liberal, Kansas. He was placed on the waived/injured list by the Browns on August 5, 2002.

Chapman was also a member of the Montreal Alouettes of the Canadian Football League (CFL).

References

External links
Just Sports Stats
College stats
NFL Draft Scout

Living people
1976 births
Players of American football from Kansas
American football defensive backs
Canadian football defensive backs
African-American players of American football
African-American players of Canadian football
Kansas State Wildcats football players
Cleveland Browns players
Montreal Alouettes players
People from Liberal, Kansas
21st-century African-American sportspeople
20th-century African-American sportspeople